Otter Creek is the name of two places in the U.S. state of Wisconsin:
Otter Creek, Dunn County, Wisconsin, a town
Otter Creek, Eau Claire County, Wisconsin, a town